Shaam Dhaley is a Pakistani drama serial that first aired on Geo Entertainment on 24 April 2016. It is produced by Babar Javed. It on airs every Saturday at 7:00.pm on Geo Entertainment. Marjan Fatima and Wajeha Khan Durani plays the Female Protagonists in the Serial while Usman Peerzada, Shah Fahad and Fiza Ali plays Supporting Characters.

Synopsis 
Alina’s life becomes more about protecting her mother and her sisters after her father’s death. But when she finds that her deceased father has also left her to deal with a brother she never knew— the last thing she wanted was losing her own house. Her life meets new complications when she finds that her father has left the house in the name of her brother.

Initially it doesn’t seem like an issue but trouble arises when their sister-in-law, Saima, comes into the picture. The only issue Saima has with her in-laws is the closeness Alina has with her brother Adeel. But Alina has bigger things on her mind— which is to take care of her sisters and her mother.

Mariam and Shanzay aren’t settling well in life. During this difficult time, Saima shows her true colors and teams up with the family attorney (Majid) to throw the family out of their own house in Khizer’s absence. As planned, Majid makes life difficult for Alina and her family. Stuck with a bitter reality, Alina stands up to every problem.

Cast
 Usman Peerzada
 Marjan Fatima
 Wajeha Khan Durani
 Parveen Malik
 Shah Fahad
 Nadia Afgan
 Tehfoor Khan Niazi
 Rashid Mehmood
 Haris Waheed
 Fiza Ali (Antagonist)
 Khalid Butt

See also
 Geo TV
 List of Pakistani television series
 List of programs broadcast by Geo Entertainment

References

External links
 

 
A&B Entertainment
2016 Pakistani television series debuts
2016 Pakistani television series endings